The Cedar Bridge Tavern is a historic building located in the New Jersey Pine Barrens in  Barnegat Township. It was built around 1740 and is believed to be the oldest intact bar in the United States.  It is located at the site of the last skirmish of the American Revolutionary War. It is on the National Register of Historic Places.

History

The Affair at Cedar Bridge or the Battle of Cedar Bridge
While the Siege of Yorktown and surrender by Cornwallis is considered the last major conflict on American soil during the American Revolution, dozens of small engagements and skirmishes took place up to the signing of the Treaty of Paris. The last conflict took place on the Jersey Shore in 1782.

On December 27, 1782, forces for the new republic led by Captains Richard Shreve and Edward Thomas were informed that notorious Loyalist John Bacon was in the vicinity of the tavern.  They engaged Bacon and his Loyalist bandits (known now as "Refugees") at Cedar Bridge.  A brief exchange of gunfire took place, and Bacon and his men were able to escape.  One Patriot was killed, and four were wounded. Four Loyalists were wounded, including Bacon.

Historic site
According to a 1981 survey by preservationists working with the New Jersey Office of Cultural and Environmental Services, the Cedar Bridge Tavern was estimated to have been built around 1740 close to a stage coach route between Camden and the Jersey Shore. The wood-sided tavern with the long front porch has served as a hotel, restaurant and bar for travelers.  Ocean County purchased the property from its last owner, Rudolf Koenig, in 2008 for $120,000.  The structure still sits on dirt road and is surrounded by pine trees. It was added to the National Register of Historic Places on August 7, 2013. Ocean County is spending $2.2 million to refurbish and develop the site, including building a caretaker's cottage and an outdoor classroom facility.

Historical reenactment
The "Affair at Cedar Bridge" is reenacted each year on December 17.

References

Farner, Thomas P. New Jersey in History: Fighting to Be Heard. Down the Shore Pub., January 1, 1996.
Historic Pen Company. Accessed May 8, 2016.

External links
Cedar Bridge Tavern, U.S. National Register of Historic Places - NPS Document
 

Barnegat Township, New Jersey
National Register of Historic Places in Ocean County, New Jersey
Historic American Buildings Survey in New Jersey
Buildings and structures completed in 1740
Taverns in New Jersey
Taverns in the American Revolution
New Jersey in the American Revolution
Drinking establishments on the National Register of Historic Places in New Jersey
Battles of the American Revolutionary War in New Jersey
American Revolution on the National Register of Historic Places
Conflicts in 1782